The 2012–13 season will be Ferencvárosi TC's 110th competitive season, 4th consecutive season in the OTP Bank Liga and 113th year in existence as a football club.

First team squad

Transfers

Summer

In:

Out:

Winter

In:

Out:

List of Hungarian football transfers summer 2012
List of Hungarian football transfers winter 2012–13

Statistics

Appearances and goals
Last updated on 2 June 2013.

|-
|colspan="14"|Youth players:

|-
|colspan="14"|Players out to loan:

|-
|colspan="14"|Players no longer at the club

|}

Top scorers
Includes all competitive matches. The list is sorted by shirt number when total goals are equal.

Last updated on 2 June 2013

Disciplinary record
Includes all competitive matches. Players with 1 card or more included only.

Last updated on 2 June 2013

Overall
{|class="wikitable"
|-
|Games played || 42 (30 OTP Bank Liga, 1 Hungarian Cup and 11 Hungarian League Cup)
|-
|Games won || 22 (13 OTP Bank Liga, 0 Hungarian Cup and 9 Hungarian League Cup)
|-
|Games drawn || 11 (10 OTP Bank Liga, 0 Hungarian Cup and 1 Hungarian League Cup)
|-
|Games lost || 9 (7 OTP Bank Liga, 1 Hungarian Cup and 1 Hungarian League Cup)
|-
|Goals scored || 79
|-
|Goals conceded || 49
|-
|Goal difference || +30
|-
|Yellow cards || 91
|-
|Red cards || 7
|-
|rowspan="1"|Worst discipline ||  Vladan Čukić (18 , 0 )
|-
|rowspan="1"|Best result || 5–0 (A) v Szolnoki MÁV FC - Ligakupa - 13-11-2012
|-
|rowspan="4"|Worst result || 0–2 (H) v Budapest Honvéd FC - OTP Bank Liga - 25-08-2012
|-
| 0–2 (H) v Szombathelyi Haladás - Hungarian Cup - 26-09-2012
|-
| 2–4 (A) v MTK Budapest FC - OTP Bank Liga - 03-11-2012
|-
| 2–4 (A) v Lombard-Pápa TFC - Ligakupa - 06-03-2013
|-
|rowspan="1"|Most appearances ||  Gábor Gyömbér (39 appearances)
|-
|rowspan="1"|Top scorer ||  Dániel Böde (20 goals)
|-
|Points || 77/126 (61.11%)
|-

Nemzeti Bajnokság I

Matches

Classification

Results summary

Results by round

Points by opponent

Hungarian Cup

League Cup

Group stage

Classification

Knockout phase

References

External links
 Eufo
 Official Website
 UEFA
 fixtures and results

2012-13
Hungarian football clubs 2012–13 season